Fernando Elboj Broto (14 July 1946 – 30 January 2023) was a Spanish politician and schoolteacher. A member of the Spanish Socialist Workers' Party, he served in the Senate from 1982 to 1989 and again from 2008 to 2011.

Elboj died in Huesca on 30 January 2023, at the age of 76.

References

1946 births
2023 deaths
Spanish Socialist Workers' Party politicians
Members of the 2nd Senate of Spain
Members of the 3rd Senate of Spain
Members of the 9th Senate of Spain
Members of the 10th Senate of Spain
People from Huesca